"Not Gonna Not" is a song co-written and recorded by Canadian country music duo the Reklaws. The duo wrote the song with Gavin Slate, Travis Wood, and producer Todd Clark. It was the second single off their second studio album Sophomore Slump.

Music video
The official music video for "Not Gonna Not" was directed by Ben Knechtel and premiered on October 16, 2020, the same day the Sophomore Slump album was released. The video was filmed in the duo's hometown of Cambridge, Ontario.

Chart performance
"Not Gonna Not" reached a peak of number 5 on the Billboard Canada Country chart dated February 27, 2021. It also peaked at #74 on Canadian Hot 100 in the same week.

References

2020 songs
2020 singles
The Reklaws songs
Universal Music Canada singles
Songs written by Todd Clark
Songs written by Gavin Slate
Songs written by Jenna Walker
Songs written by Stuart Walker (singer)
Songs written by Travis Wood (songwriter)
Song recordings produced by Todd Clark